The Sudbury Arts Council is a non-profit organization based in Greater Sudbury, Ontario, Canada.  It was created in 1974 as the Sudbury Arts Festival Association, and changed its name in June 1988.

The volunteer board and membership work to promote the arts in the City of Greater Sudbury.

The Sudbury Arts Council was instrumental in establishing Cinefest, the Artists' Studio Tour and the Sudbury Writers' Guild. In June 2013, SAC held a literary festival.  Special guest was Tomson Highway.

Headliners at the 2015 Wordstock included Sandra Shamis and Terry Fallis.

In 2014, the Sudbury Arts Council took a lead role in establishing the Mayor's Celebration of the Arts, a gala event that honours artists and raises money for artists' bursaries. It took place May 1, 2014. Visual artist Heather Topp and writer Matthew Heiti were honoured,
The 2015 event took place on May 21. Winners were textile artist Ann Suzuki, musician Jamie Dupuis and actor Stef Paquette.

Presidents of the arts council have included Laurence Steven, Jan Carrie Steven, Jon Butler, Ed Tate, Dereck Young, Gord Harris, John Lindsay, Vicki Gilhula and Linda Cartier.

External links
Sudbury Arts Council

Sources: http://www.sudburylivingmagazine.com/2015/05/21/jamie-dupuis-stef-paquette-and-ann-suzuki-honoured-at-celebration-of-the-arts.html

Culture of Greater Sudbury
Arts councils of Canada
Organizations based in Greater Sudbury